Allan Outridge (1912 – February 1997) was a Guyanese cricketer. He played in two first-class matches for British Guiana in 1943/44 and 1945/46.

See also
 List of Guyanese representative cricketers

References

External links
 

1912 births
1997 deaths
Guyanese cricketers
Guyana cricketers
Sportspeople from Georgetown, Guyana